The heats for the men's 200 metre freestyle race at the 2009 World Championships took place on the morning of 27 July and the final took place in the evening session of 28 July at the Foro Italico in Rome, Italy.

Records
Prior to this competition, the existing world and competition records were as follows:

The following records were established during the competition:

Results

Heats

Semifinals

Final

External links
Heats Results
Semifinals Results
Final Results

Freestyle Men 200